Ribes alpinum, known as mountain currant or alpine currant, is a small deciduous, dioecious shrub native to central and northern Europe from Finland and Norway south to the Alps and Pyrenees and Caucasus, Georgia; in the south of its range, it is confined to high altitudes. It is scarce in western Europe, in Britain being confined to a small number of sites in northern England and Wales.

The bark is initially smooth and light grey, later it becomes brownish grey and eventually starts to flake off. The buds are scattered, compressed and light green to white. The leaves are palmate. The upper side of the leaves are dark green with scattered hair, while the bottom is light green. The male and female flowers are on distinct specimens. Both kinds of flowers are organized in clusters in the corners of the leaves, where the male's are the longest. The individual flowers are small and greenish-yellow. The fruit is red, clear and resembles a redcurrant, but has an insipid taste. The seeds germinate readily.

References

alpinum
Flora of Europe
Plants described in 1753
Taxa named by Carl Linnaeus
Dioecious plants